Dyurtyuli (Dürtöylö) is a rural locality (a village) in Novoberdyashsky Selsoviet, Karaidelsky District, Bashkortostan, Russia. The population was 29 as of 2010. There is 1 street.

Geography 
Dyurtyuli is located 39 km southeast of Karaidel (the district's administrative centre) by road. Kadysi is the nearest rural locality.

References 

Rural localities in Karaidelsky District